Dr. Rafael Ma. Moscoso National Botanical Garden (Jardin Botanico Nacional Dr. Rafael Ma. Moscoso) is a botanical garden in the heart of Santo Domingo.  The park was founded in 1976 and was named after Rafael Maria Moscoso, a Dominican botanist who cataloged the flora on the island of Hispaniola.

The garden's symbol is a "guanito" leaf (Coccothrinax argentea) which is a palm tree found in the garden.  The garden is a decentralized institution that reports to the Dominican Republic's Presidential Ministry of Management.

References

External links
 http://www.jbn-sdq.org - Official Site

Buildings and structures in Santo Domingo
Botanical gardens in the Dominican Republic
1976 establishments in the Dominican Republic
Geography of Santo Domingo
Tourist attractions in Santo Domingo
An open-air trolley (operating every 30 minutes until 4:30pm) takes passengers on a pleasant half-hour turn about the park and is especially enjoyable for children. The garden hosts a variety of events, including an orchid exhibition and competition in March and a bonsai exhibition in April